Winthrop Public Schools may refer to:
 Winthrop School District (Arkansas)
 Winthrop Public Schools (Maine)
 Winthrop Public Schools (Massachusetts)